William John Bray CBE (10 September 1911 in  Fratton, Portsmouth – 6 September 2004) was a communications engineer and director of research at the Post Office Research Station, between 1966 and 1975. In 1972 he presented the Bernard Price Memorial Lecture in South Africa.

Articles
 Bray, W.J. and Lowry, W.R.H. (1939). A New Short-wave Transatlantic Radio Receiver. POEEJ 32 (1): 24-31
 Bray, W.J. (1948). The Possibilities of Super-High-Frequency Radio and Waveguide Systems for Telecommunications, IPOEE Printed Paper No. 197, 1948.
 Booth, C.F. and Bray, W.J. (1949). A report on microwave radio relay and waveguide systems studied in USA. Report by Experimental and Development Branch of Post Office Engineering Department. (Copy held in UK National Archives  WO 195/10701.)
 Bray, W.J. (1950). A Survey of Modern Radio Valves. Part 6(a). Valves for Use at Frequencies Above 3,000 Mc/s, POEEJ 43 (3): 148-153
 Bray, W.J. (1951). A Survey of Modern Radio Valves. Part 6(b). Valves for Use at Frequencies Above 3,000 Mc/s, POEEJ 43 (4): 187-191

Books
Bray, J. (1995). The Communications Miracle: Telecommunications Pioneers from Morse to the Information Superhighway, Perseus Books, 
Bray, J. (1999). Then, Now and Tomorrow: The Autobiography of a Communications Engineer, The Book Guild Ltd, 
Bray, J. (2002). Innovation and the Communications Revolution, Institution of Electrical Engineers,

External links
Times Obituary
IET, "Satcoms pioneer John Bray dies, aged 92"
The First Trans-Atlantic Transmission of Television on 10 July 1962, By John Bray

1911 births
2004 deaths
Engineers from Portsmouth
Commanders of the Order of the British Empire
British Telecom people
20th-century British engineers